Miyoshi-ike (三好池) is an earthfill dam located in Aichi Prefecture in Japan. The dam is used for irrigation. The catchment area of the dam is 0.8 km2. The dam impounds about 41  ha of land when full and can store 2235 thousand cubic meters of water. The construction of the dam was started on 1956 and completed in 1958.

References

Dams in Aichi Prefecture
1958 establishments in Japan